LaToya, Latoya, or La Toya may refer to:
 Latoya (given name), list of people with the given name
 La Toya Jackson (born 1956), American singer and member of the Jackson family
 La Toya (album) (also titled You're Gonna Get Rocked!), the fifth studio album by La Toya Jackson

See also
 LaToyia Figueroa (1981–2005), American murder victim from Philadelphia
 LeToya Luckett (born 1981), American singer and former member of Destiny's Child
 Nadja LaToya Benaissa (born 1982), German singer and former member of No Angels